Roland Bénabou is a French economist, who is currently the Theodore A. Wells '29 Professor of Economics and Public Affairs at Princeton University. He is also a research associate at the Collège de France.

Bénabou holds engineering degrees from the Ecole Polytechnique (1980) and the Ecole des Ponts et Chaussées (1982). He received his Ph.D. in economics from MIT in 1986.

From 1986 to 1988, Bénabou began his career as a research associate at the CNRS. He then returned to MIT, first as an assistant professor (1988-1992), then as an associate professor (1992-1994). Bénabou was eventually appointed full professor at NYU in 1996.

He joined Princeton's faculty in 1999.

Bénabou has published numerous papers with Nobel Laureate Jean Tirole.

Bénabou's research spans both macroeconomic and microeconomic areas, such as the interplay of inflation and imperfect competition, or speculation and manipulation in financial markets. His recent work lies in three main areas. The first links inequality, growth, social mobility and the political economy of redistribution. The second centers on education, social interactions and the socioeconomic structure of cities. The third is that of economics and psychology ("behavioral economics"). It focuses in particular on extrinsic incentives versus intrinsic motivation, on the determinants of prosocial behavior and on motivated beliefs, both individual (overconfidence, wishful thinking, identity) and collective (groupthink, market manias, ideology, religion).

References

Year of birth missing (living people)
Living people
Princeton University faculty
MIT School of Humanities, Arts, and Social Sciences alumni
Fellows of the American Academy of Arts and Sciences
Labor economists
20th-century American economists
21st-century American economists
Fellows of the Econometric Society
French economists